Serious Hang is a live album by trumpeter Jack Walrath which was recorded in 1992 and released on the Muse label in 1994.

Reception

The AllMusic review by Ron Wynn stated "Jack Walrath and his Masters of Suspense turn to an idiom that was once among jazz's more popular, but in recent years has been almost ignored -- funk/soul-jazz. ... Walrath's trumpet and flugelhorn horn solos are always intense and occasionally exciting ... the Masters of Suspense do a good job of displaying their soul-jazz chops".

Track listing
All compositions by Jack Walrath except where noted
 "Anya and Liz on the Veranda" – 6:36
 "Get on the Good Foot" (James Brown, Fred Wesley, Joe Mims) – 5:11
 "Better Get Hit in Yo' Soul" (Charles Mingus) – 8:06
 "Izlyal e Delyo Haidoutin (Haidouk Delyo Has Joined the Rebels)" (Traditional) – 7:29
 "Monk's Feet" – 6:50
 "Decisions" (Don Pullen) – 3:04
 "Gloomy Sunday" (Rezsö Seress, Sam M. Lewis) – 6:31
 "Weird and Wonderful" – 8:08

Personnel
Jack Walrath – trumpet, flugelhorn
Don Pullen – piano
David Fiuczynski – guitar
Michael Formanek – bass 
Cecil Brooks III – drums

References

Muse Records albums
Jack Walrath albums
1994 albums
Albums recorded at Van Gelder Studio